Neve Granot is a neighborhood in Jerusalem located behind the Israel Museum, overlooking the Monastery of the Cross.

Neve Granot is named for Avraham Granot, a Zionist activist and signatory of the Israeli Declaration of Independence who went on to become head of the Jewish National Fund. The Schechter Institute of Jewish Studies in Neve Granot built its new campus there, designed by Israeli architect Ada Carmi.

References

Neighbourhoods of Jerusalem